, there were 17,460 electric vehicles registered in Michigan.

Government policy
, the state government offers tax rebates of $2,000 for electric vehicle purchases.

Charging stations
, there were 1,033 charging station locations in Michigan with 2,322 charging ports.

The Infrastructure Investment and Jobs Act, signed into law in November 2021, allocates  to charging stations in Michigan.

Manufacturing
Michigan was historically a manufacturing hub for gasoline-powered cars, which has led many electric vehicle manufacturers to establish manufacturing hubs in the state.

By region

Detroit
, there are plans to outfit sections of road in Detroit with wireless charging infrastructure that charges vehicles while driving by 2024. If completed, it would be the first installation of such technology in the United States.

Kalamazoo
The first charging station for electric trucks in Michigan opened in Kalamazoo in August 2022.

References

Michigan
Road transportation in Michigan